Blimbing is a village in the town of Mandiraja Banjarnegara Regency, Central Java Province, Indonesia. This village has an area of 97,56 hectares and a population of 2.005 inhabitants in 2010.

References

External links
 Banjarnegara Regency Official website
 BPS Kabupaten Banjarnegara

Banjarnegara Regency
Villages in Central Java